Paul Matthews may refer to:

 Paul Taunton Matthews (1919–1987), British theoretical physicist
 Paul Matthews (bishop) (1866–1954), Episcopal bishop of New Jersey
 Paul Matthews (musician) (born 1978), New Zealand musician, songwriter, and record producer
 Paul Matthews (poet), British poet featured in Children of Albion
 Paul Matthews (footballer) (born 1946), English footballer